Ndoc Mark Gega (c. 1830 – 1908?) or Noc Mark Deda was an Albanian patriot who is known as a legend and hero after dying defending himself from Turkish and Serb invading forces. He was born in Berishë in the region of Pukë to a patriotic family who always fought occupiers. In 1908, when the Young Turks established power in Albania, they did house-to-house search in Albanian homes in order to gather arms. Gega refused to surrender his weapon together with his brothers Gjergj and Mehil. Ndoc had for 2 months spent his time in the mountains with Malesor (highlanders) defending their territories against Turks.

Resistance 

Gegas house was surrounded after him refusing to obey the Turkish forces around 10 at night. A fierce fighting began and Gegas father, Mark Deda, was killed. His brother Mehil was wounded and Gjergis arm was hit by a bullet, making him crippled. The fighting continued until 5 in the morning and Ndoc Mark Gega managed to shoot the commander of the Turkish forces. Gega was shortly after wounded. Other Albanians, being alarmed by the fighting, joined the fighting and the fighting continued to the "Lisi i Lekes" region.

Death 

Koc Marku, Mehmet Doci helped Gega to escape his house and pass the Drin river at Toplane. They were all wounded and managed to get inside a cave which today is called "The cave of Ndoc Mark Gega". They managed to survive the cold winters and the father of Gega was buried by neighboring patriots according to the ceremonies at the time. The brothers survived for 3 months in the cave. Once again the Turks attacked from Qyqesh and went to Berishe but were defeated by Ndoc Mark Gega and his companions Gjelosh Kecani, the Koliku and the Mehil Brothers, Tom Karoli and Koc Marku.

Simultaneously, invading serb forces attacked the Dukagjini region. In the Highlands, Gega and his brothers joined the malesores in order to fight the invaders. After several fights in Shala and Shoshi, Ndoc Mark Gega and his brothers were surrounded by Serb forces. His brothers were killed and also 13 others who were members of the band. Ndoci survived, wounded, and managed to kill the serb commander. He returned home where he died of his wounds.

References

Year of birth uncertain
1907 deaths
Activists of the Albanian National Awakening
19th-century Albanian people
20th-century Albanian people
Albanian Roman Catholics